The  refers to a collection of governing rules compiled and promulgated in 689, one of the first, if not the first collection of Ritsuryō laws in classical Japan.  This also marks the initial appearance of the central administrative body called the Daijō-kan (Council of State) composed of the three ministers—the Daijō-daijin (Chancellor), the Sadaijin (Minister of the Left) and the Udaijin (Minister of the Right).

In 662, Emperor Tenji is said to have compiled the first Japanese legal code known to modern historians. The Ōmi-ryō, consisting of 22 volumes, was promulgated in the last year of Tenji's reign.  This legal codification is no longer extant, but it is said to have been refined in what is known as the Asuka Kiyomihara ritsu-ryō of 689.  The compilation was commenced in 681 under Emperor Tenmu. The Emperor died in 686, but the finalization of the Code took a few more years. It was promulgated in 689. These are understood to have been a forerunner of the Taihō ritsu-ryō of 701.

Although not "finalized" (not incorporating a penal code, a ritsu, for instance), the code already incorporated several important regulations (for instance compulsory registration for citizens and pestilence reporting system), which paved the way for the more complete Taihō Code.

See also
 Ritsuryō
 Ōmi Code
 Taihō Code
 Yōrō Code

Notes

References
 Farris, William Wayne. (1998).  Sacred Texts and Buried Treasures: Issues in the Historical Archaeology of Ancient Japan. Honolulu: University of Hawaii Press. 
 Hall, John Whitney, Delmer M. Brown and Kozo Yamamura. (1993).  The Cambridge History of Japan. Cambridge: Cambridge University Press. 
 Ponsonby-Fane, Richard Arthur Brabazon. (1959).  The Imperial House of Japan. Kyoto: Ponsonby Memorial Society. OCLC 194887
 Varley, H. Paul, ed. (1980). Kitabatake Chikafusa, 1359, Jinnō Shōtōki ("A Chronicle of Gods and Sovereigns: Jinnō Shōtōki of Kitabatake Chikafusa" translated by H. Paul Varley). New York: Columbia University Press.  

7th century in Japan
Legal history of Japan
Legal codes
7th century in law
Emperor Tenmu
689